Salem Speedway is a  long paved oval racetrack in Washington Township, Washington County, near Salem, Indiana, United States, approximately  south of Indianapolis. The track has 33° degrees of banking in the corners. Major auto racing series that run at Salem are ARCA and USAC.

History
It opened in 1947; two drivers were killed on the first lap of the first race. The track received major storm damage in 1981 and it was not used until 1987. A thunderstorm had ripped the roof off the grandstands and fences were damaged. Don Gettelfinger Sr. bought the track in 1987 and he replaced the fence with concrete. The track closed in May 1995 when he declared bankruptcy. Owen and Beverly Thompson bought the track and reopened it in 1996 after adding a new building, redoing the grandstand seating to a new capacity of 6000 people, and renovating the pits. Thompson leased the track to Bill Kniesly starting in 2020. Former driver Nick Bohanon bought the racetrack in December 2022.

Appearance of Touring Series
The NASCAR Grand National East Series ran one race at the speedway; it was won by Bruce Gould in 1973.

The ASA National Tour ran six races at the track, from 1998 through 2003 and the winners were Scott Hansen (twice), David Stremme, Tim Sauter, Gary St. Amant and Robbie Pyle.

USAR ran seven races at the track between 2002 and 2008; winners include Brian Ross, Joel Kauffman, Mikey Kile, Jeff Agnew, Gary St. Amant.

NASCAR Southeast Series ran two races at the facility between 1996 and 1997; the races were won by Steven Christian and Ron Young respectively.

Salem Speedway has seen many great racers who are household names, such as Ruttman, Carter, Sweikert, O’Connor, Parnelli Jones, A. J. Foyt, Al Unser, Mario Andretti, Vogler, Allison, Parsons, Waltrip, Jeff Gordon, Mark Martin, Tony Stewart, Jimmie Johnson, Ryan Newman, Busch, Kasey Kahne, Ken Schrader, Joey Logano, and the list goes on. In 2018, Kody Swanson broke the all-time USAC Silvercrown record with his 24th series win at Salem.

As of 2019, the track has held more ARCA races than any other track (106th visit); it held races at the track since 1955. The ARCA qualifying record is 16.785 seconds/119.035 mph by Gary Bradberry in 1994.

Rich Vogler 
On July 21, 1990, during the Joe James / Pat O'Connor Memorial sprint car event at the Salem Speedway, which was nationally broadcast on ESPN Thunder, sprint car driver Rich Vogler sustained fatal head injuries due to a crash in turn 4. Vogler, who was leading the event at the time and was about to take the white flag signaling one lap to go, hit head on with the turn 4 wall, violently throwing tires, Vogler's helmet, and other pieces of Vogler's car all over the track. The race was red flagged and would never restart. Vogler, now dead at the age of 39, was declared the winner posthumously because of USAC National Sprint Car Series rules on a red flag reverting to the previous completed lap.  This was his 170th win.  Finishing first among the survivors was a young driver from Pittsboro, Indiana, named Jeff Gordon.

References

External links
 Speedway website
 Salem Speedway race results at Racing-Reference
 Salem Speedway race results at The Third Turn

Motorsport venues in Indiana
ARCA Menards Series tracks
NASCAR tracks
Tourist attractions in Washington County, Indiana
Buildings and structures in Washington County, Indiana
1947 establishments in Indiana
Sports venues completed in 1947